Robert Hammond (born 1969) is a co-founder and the executive director of Friends of the High Line.

Background
Originally from San Antonio, Texas, Hammond graduated with honors in history from Princeton University. Before working on the High Line, Hammond was a consultant for the Times Square Alliance, for the Alliance for the Arts and National Cooperative Bank (NCB), and an ex-officio trustee of the Metropolitan Museum of Art.

Honors and awards
He won the Rome Prize from the American Academy in Rome in 2009. In 2012, he was awarded an honorary doctorate from The New School. In 2013, the National Building Museum awarded Hammond and his business partner Joshua David the Vincent Scully Prize for "excellence in ... historic preservation".

References

External links
 
 

1960s births
Living people